Akhaltsikhe (Akhaltsikhis munitsip’alit’et’i) ) is a municipality in Georgia's southern region of Samtskhe-Javakheti. As of 2021 it had a population of 39,463 people. The city of Akhaltsikhe is its administrative centre.

Administrative divisions

Akhaltsikhe municipality is administratively divided into two cities (Akhaltsikhe and Vale) and 14 communities (თემი, temi) with 46 villages (სოფელი, sopeli).

The city of Akhaltsikhe was separated in 2014 from the municipality and was a so-called "self-governed" city (or kalaki). This administrative and governance reform was deemed too inefficient and expensive and was revoked in 2017. Since then, the city of Akhaltsikhe has been part of the general municipality again.

Politics
Akhaltsikhe Municipal Assembly (Georgian: ახალციხის საკრებულო, Akhaltsikhe Sakrebulo) is a representative body in Akhaltsikhe Municipality, consisting of 39 members which are elected every four years. The last election was held in October 2021. Irakli Lazarashvili of Georgian Dream was elected mayor.

Population 
By the start of 2021 the population was determined at 39,463 people, a slight increase compared to the 2014 census. The population of Akhaltsikhe city decreased slightly during the same period.

The population of Akhaltsikhe consists for 68% of Georgians. By far the largest ethnic minority are the Armenians, who make up 31% of the population. Other minorities are a few dozen Russians, Greeks, Ukrainians, Ossetes and a few Abkhazians. In terms of religion, 68% of the population are followers of the Georgian Orthodox Church and 17.4% are followers of the Armenian Apostolic Church. Another large group by Georgian standards are Catholics (12.6%). Furthermore, there are small numbers of followers of Jehovah's Witnesses and Islam.

In November 1944, the Meskhetian Turks, a Turkic-speaking ethnic group of predominantly Muslim faith living in this area, were deported to Soviet Central Asian republics as part of a Stalinist resettlement operation. At that time, the Meskhetians constituted half of the population of the raion Akhaltsikhe (1939: 28,428 of the 55,490 inhabitants). Attempts to return them to independent Georgia have failed, with local resistance.

See also 
 List of municipalities in Georgia (country)

External links 

 Website Municipality

References

Municipalities of Samtskhe–Javakheti